Seán Powter (born 30 July 1997) is an Irish Gaelic footballer who plays as a centre-forward for the Cork senior team.

Born in Rochestown, County Cork, Powter was first introduced to Gaelic games in his youth. He developed his skills in both hurling and Gaelic football at St. Francis College while simultaneously enjoying championship success as a dual player at underage levels with Douglas.

Powter made his debut on the inter-county scene at the age of sixteen when he first linked up with the Cork minor teams as a dual player. After little success in these grades, he later won one Munster medal with the under-21 team. Powter made his senior debut during the 2016 championship.

Career statistics

Honours

Douglas
Cork Minor Football Championship (1): 2013
Cork Minor Hurling Championship (1): 2015

Cork
Munster Under-21 Football Championship (1): 2016

References

1997 births
Living people
UCC Gaelic footballers
Douglas Gaelic footballers
Douglas hurlers
Cork inter-county Gaelic footballers
Cork inter-county hurlers